Luni is a town in Jodhpur district of the Indian state of Rajasthan. It is located 35 km South from Jodhpur district headquarters, Luni is also the headquarters of Luni tehsil.

Geography
Luni is located in Central Rajasthan on the banks of the Luni River. Luni is near the villages of Shikarpura, Satlana, French, and Barliya. The nearest city, the District capital of Jodhpur, is 35 km (22 mi) away.

The artisans inhabiting the village pursue their ancestral profession of fashioning metal, clay or wood into intricate forms.

Demographics

Climate
In the winter, it can range from 15 degrees to 25 degrees. Nights are cool and days are hot and humid.

Tourist attractions

Fort Chanwa

Fort Chanwa is a red sandstone fort. It was built around 1895 by Kaviraja Muraridan Ashiya(charan) of Bhandiyawas who received Luni as jagir during the rule of Maharaja Jaswant Singh II of Marwar. The red sandstone was brought from Jodhpur for construction. Later the fort became a heritage hotel. Its main features are manicured gardens, carved lattice work friezes and Jharokas (or balconies).

Shikarpura

In Rajasthan, saint Raja Ram established a Math (Ashram) in Shikarapura near Luni, Jodhpur. This ashram is famous as Shikarpura Ashram.

References

Villages in Jodhpur district
Charan